The Sherbino Mesa Wind Farm is located in Pecos County in west Texas. The first 150 megawatts (MW) of the project, which has a potential capacity of 750 MW, is in operation. Phase I utilizes 50 Vestas V-90 Mk.5 wind turbine generators, each with a rated capacity of 3 MW. BP will operate phase I of the project.

This phase will be in operation by the end of 2011.

See also

List of wind farms
Wind power in Texas

References

Energy infrastructure completed in 2008
Wind farms in Texas
Buildings and structures in Pecos County, Texas
BP buildings and structures
2008 establishments in Texas